Nanobit is a Croatian video game developer from Zagreb, and subsidiary of the Stillfront Group. They specialize in iOS and Android platform games. They have opened two additional offices in Budapest and Bucharest.

Accolades and recognition
The company won technological innovation Ernst & Young Entrepreneur of the Year Award in 2015. They are on top 200 most profitable developers on Apple store.

References

External links
http://www.hrt.hr/282612/magazin/nanobit-prica-o-uspjehu

Video game companies of Croatia
Video game development companies
Video game companies established in 2008
Mobile game companies
2008 establishments in Croatia
Companies based in Zagreb